Robert Wilhelm Ferdinand von Hippel (8 July 1866 - 16 June 1951) was a German jurist and University lecturer born in Königsberg.

Family
Robert was the son of Arthur von Hippel (physician) and elder brother of Eugen von Hippel and Richard von Hippel (1869-1918). He married Emma Bremer (1871-1925) in Strasbourg during 1894 and was the father of four children, including German-American physicist Arthur R. von Hippel. After the death of his first wife, he married Johanna von Koenen (1882-1965), the daughter of Adolf von Koenen, in Göttingen during 1927.

Career
After graduating from high school, he devoted himself to studying law at the University of Marburg, and in 1888 he obtained a doctorate in law. He subsequently worked as a trainee lawyer before becoming an assistant to Franz von Liszt in 1889. He became a professor at University of Kiel in 1891 and University of Strasbourg in 1892, before becoming a professor of criminal law at University of Rostock in 1895. He finally became a professor at the University of Göttingen in 1899. In 1914, he was promoted to privy councillor of justice.

Works
Die Vorschläge zur Einführung der bedingten Verurtheilung in Deutschland, Enke, 1890
Aktenstücke zum Strafprozess für Lehrzwecke, S. Hirzel, 1898
Willensfreiheit und Strafrecht, I. Guttentag, 1903
Verbrechen und Vergehen wider die öffentliche Ordnung, Liebmann, 1906
Deutsches Strafrecht, 2 Bände, J. Springer, 1925–1930
Die Entstehung der modernen Freiheitsstrafe und des Erziehungs-Strafvollzugs, Thüringische Gefängnisgesellschaft, 1931
Der deutsche Strafprozeß: Lehrbuch, Elwert’sche Verlagsbuchhandlung, 1941

References

External links
Literature regarding Robert von Hippel

1866 births
1951 deaths
Academic staff of the University of Rostock
Jurists from Königsberg
People from the Province of Prussia
Academic staff of the University of Kiel
University of Marburg alumni
Academic staff of the University of Strasbourg
Academic staff of the University of Göttingen